The Matthew Harvey House is a historic house on Harvey Street in Sutton, New Hampshire, and the centerpiece of Muster Field Farm, a working farm museum. Built in 1784, it is a prominent local example of Federal period architecture, and the homestead of a politically powerful family. The house was listed on the National Register of Historic Places in 1992.

Description and history
The Matthew Harvey House is located in northern Sutton, in a rural setting on the west side of Harvey Road. It is part of a larger farm property that includes several agricultural buildings, which are located on both sides of the road. The house is set near the top of a ridge, from which views extend over the farm fields. It is a -story wood-frame structure with a side-gable roof, clapboarded exterior, and central chimney. It is oriented with its main facade facing roughly south, and a secondary side elevation toward the road. The main facade is five bays wide, with a center entrance. The entry is flanked by unusual sidelight windows which include a sliding sash, with pilasters outside rising to an entablature. Windows are set in rectangular openings with delicate Federal moulding, the second-story windows smaller than those on the first floor.

This elegant Federal-style wood-frame house was built in 1784, at a time when Harvey Street was a major north–south thoroughfare.  Matthew Harvey, who had settled the land in 1772, built this house, from which he operated a tavern that may have been the first in Sutton. At his death in 1799 he was the largest landowner in town. The heavy frame of the house suggests it may have been built by someone more experienced in building larger wood-frame buildings such as meeting houses; Harvey's cousin John is known to have engaged in this business, and may have been the builder of this house.

The house was next occupied by Jonathan Harvey, who, along with his brother Matthew, were involved in state-level politics, serving in both the state legislature and the United States Congress. Matthew Harvey also served one term as Governor of New Hampshire, and as a federal judge. The house remained in the Harvey family until 1941. It was then acquired by the Bristol family, a locally prominent family that oversaw its transformation into a working farm museum.

See also
National Register of Historic Places listings in Merrimack County, New Hampshire

References

External links
Muster Field Farm website

Houses completed in 1784
Houses on the National Register of Historic Places in New Hampshire
Georgian architecture in New Hampshire
Federal architecture in New Hampshire
Houses in Merrimack County, New Hampshire
National Register of Historic Places in Merrimack County, New Hampshire
Sutton, New Hampshire
Museums in Merrimack County, New Hampshire